Lambert Ferri (fl. c. 1250–1300) was a trouvère and cleric at the Benedictine monastery at Saint-Léonard, Pas-de-Calais. By 1268 he was a canon and a deacon of the monastery; he is last associated with the monastery in 1282.

He was a popular partner for jeux partis, of which some twenty-seven survive between him and other composers, including Jehan Bretel, Jehan le Cuvelier d'Arras, Jehan de Grieviler, Jehan de Marli, Phelipot Verdiere, Robert Casnois, and Robert de La Pierre. Eleven of his songs have surviving melodies, including seven of the jeux partis, three chansons, and one Marian serventois.

Table of extant songs

References
Parker, Ian R. "Ferri, Lambert." Grove Music Online. Oxford Music Online. Accessed 20 September 2008.

Notes

Trouvères
French Benedictines
Male classical composers